Center Township is a township in Clinton County, Iowa, USA. At the 2000 census, its population was 626.

History
Center Township was organized in 1852.

Geography
According to the USGS, it contains two cemeteries: Center Grove and Elvira.

Notes

References
 USGS Geographic Names Information System (GNIS)

External links
 US-Counties.com
 City-Data.com

Townships in Clinton County, Iowa
Townships in Iowa
1852 establishments in Iowa
Populated places established in 1852